Denis Yuryevich Vikhrov (born 15 March 1992) is a Russian former football player.

Club career
He made his professional debut in the Russian Football National League for FC Dynamo Saint Petersburg on 30 March 2014 in a game against FC Angusht Nazran.

References

External links
 
 

1992 births
Living people
Russian footballers
Association football defenders
PFC Krylia Sovetov Samara players
FC Dynamo Saint Petersburg players
FC Rubin Yalta players